The Melipotini are a tribe of moths in the family Erebidae.

Genera

Boryzops
Bulia
Cissusa
Drasteria
Forsebia
Ianius
Litocala
Melipotis
Orodesma
Panula
Phoberia

References

 
Erebinae
Moth tribes